Cecil Lewis may refer to:

 Cecil Arthur Lewis (1898–1997), British fighter pilot and writer
 Cecil Lewis (soccer) (born 1981), American soccer player

See also
 Cecil Day-Lewis (1904–1972), Anglo-Irish poet